Let Yourself Go: Celebrating Fred Astaire is a 2000 studio album by Stacey Kent.

This was Kent's third studio album, and was recorded in tribute to the dancer and singer Fred Astaire, who introduced many of the songs on this album.

Reception

Dave Nathan, writing on Allmusic.com gave the album three stars out of five. Nathan said that it was "another excellent album" by Kent and it was "happily recommended". Nathan praised Kent's interplay with pianist David Newton on "Isn't This a Lovely Day" and "They Can't Take That Away From Me,", and guitarist Colin Oxley on "A Fine Romance". David Adler in All About Jazz wrote that Jim Tomlinson's tenor saxophone breaks on "He Loves and She Loves" are "exquisite". He praised Kent's delivery as "charming and infectious...She pours her heart out on two devastatingly sad numbers, "By Myself" and "I Guess I'll Have to Change My Plan"".

Track listing 
 "Let Yourself Go" (Irving Berlin) - 3:48
 "They Can't Take That Away from Me" (George Gershwin, Ira Gershwin) - 5:09
 "I Won't Dance" (Dorothy Fields, Otto Harbach, Oscar Hammerstein II, Jerome Kern, Jimmy McHugh) - 4:37 
 "Isn't This a Lovely Day?" (Berlin) - 3:58
 "They All Laughed" (G. Gershwin, I. Gershwin) - 4:31
 "He Loves and She Loves" (G. Gershwin, I. Gershwin) - 4:26
 "Shall We Dance?" (G. Gershwin, I. Gershwin) - 3:03
 "One for My Baby (and One More for the Road)" (Harold Arlen, Johnny Mercer) - 5:57
 "'S Wonderful" (G. Gershwin, I Gershwin) - 6:01
 "A Fine Romance" (Fields, Kern) - 3:02
 "I Guess I'll Have to Change My Plan" (Howard Dietz, Arthur Schwartz) - 2:37
 "I'm Putting All My Eggs in One Basket" (Berlin) - 3:44
 "By Myself" (Dietz, Schwartz) - 3:48

Personnel 
Performance
 Stacey Kent – vocals, arranger
 Jim Tomlinson - clarinet, alto saxophone, tenor saxophone, arranger, producer
 David Newton - piano
 Colin Oxley - guitar
 Simon Thorpe - double bass
 Steve Brown - drums
 Simon Woolf - arranger
Production
 Curtis Schwartz - engineer, mixing
 Alan Bates - executive producer
 Paul Rider - photography

References 

2000 albums
Stacey Kent albums
Fred Astaire tribute albums
Candid Records albums